Tanmay Manoj Srivastava (born 7 November 1989) is an Indian former cricketer. Srivastava was a member of the Indian U-19 cricket team that won the 2008 U/19 Cricket World Cup tournament played in Malaysia. He scored 262 runs in six matches in that tournament. In first-class cricket, he represented Uttar Pradesh. He was the leading run scorer for Uttar Pradesh in this format in 2008–09 season.

Srivastava had been contracted by Kings XI Punjab in the Indian Premier League from 2008 to 2010. He moved to Kochi Tuskers Kerala for the 2011 season. Since Kochi Tuskers Kerala has been terminated from Indian Premier League, Tanmay moved to Deccan Chargers for the 2012 season.

On 24 October 2020, Srivastava announced his retirement from cricket.

References

External links
 

1989 births
Living people
Uttar Pradesh cricketers
Sportspeople from Kanpur
Punjab Kings cricketers
Central Zone cricketers
Indian cricketers
India Blue cricketers
India Green cricketers